Paula Raymond (born Paula Ramona Wright; November 23, 1924 – December 31, 2003) was an American model and actress who played the leading lady in numerous movies and television series including Crisis (1950) with Cary Grant. She was the niece of American pulp-magazine editor Farnsworth Wright.

Early years
Raymond was born on November 23, 1924 as Paula Ramona Wright in San Francisco, California. Her father was a corporate lawyer. Following her parents' divorce, Raymond and her mother moved to Los Angeles.

As a child, Raymond studied ballet, piano, and singing. She was a member of both the San Francisco Opera Company and the San Francisco Children's Opera Company. She graduated from Hollywood High School in 1942. Following graduation, she returned to San Francisco to attend college. She also worked with two theater companies there.

Modeling
Before she became an actress, Raymond was a photographers' model. She told author Leo Verswijver "I got started modeling at $25 an hour and [I] forgot all about acting, because I was earning a living." Her work included posing for the cover of True Confessions magazine.

Film 
Raymond's first acting role was playing Bettina Bowman in Keep Smiling (1938), credited as Paula Rae Wright. In 1950, she was put under contract by MGM, where she played opposite leading men such as Cary Grant and Dick Powell. Early in her career, Raymond acted in film noir thrillers such as the cult classic City That Never Sleeps (with Gig Young, Mala Powers and Marie Windsor), and later in her career, she acted in horror films.

In 1950, she played Cary Grant's leading lady in Crisis.

In 1952, she was co starring in The Beast From 20,000 Fathoms. Early in her career, Raymond acted in film noir thrillers such as the cult classic City That Never Sleeps (1953) with Gig Young, Mala Powers and Marie Windsor, and later in her career, she appeared in horror films. Her low-budget horror movies included Blood of Dracula's Castle. In 1954, she starred as Queen Berengaria in the film King Richard and the Crusaders. She also starred in the 1955 Western The Gun That Won the West.

Raymond did some work for Paramount Pictures using the screen name Rae Patterson.

Television 
In the late 1950s and 1960s, Raymond appeared in many television shows including Perry Mason (five episodes), Maverick, Hawaiian Eye (five episodes), M Squad (three episodes) with Lee Marvin, 77 Sunset Strip (four episodes), as Martha Harrington in Peter Gunn season 1, episode 11, in 1958. She turned down the role of saloon keeper Kitty Russell in the long-running western classic series Gunsmoke and the role went instead to Amanda Blake. She was noted as saying of this: "I didn't want to play a woman who worked in a saloon, week after week. I have a freckle on my face, and I sometimes put a beauty mark over it. They even put it on Amanda Blake, who finally got the part—although it was put on the opposite side from mine. I wanted them to soften the character but didn't think they’d do it. As it turned out, the character wasn't a trashy woman at all. She was just the type I would have liked to have played".

Raymond appeared in a 1959 episode "The Paymaster" of the ABC/Desilu western series The Life and Legend of Wyatt Earp. In Have Gun - Will Travel, "Lady with a Gun", season 3, episode 30, she played Eve McIntosh, a woman seeking revenge for her brother's killing. In 1960, she appeared in two episodes of Bat Masterson, once as Angie in “Last of the Night Raiders” and as Linda Wells in “Mr. Fourpaws”. In 1961, she also played opposite Jack 
Kelly as Bart Maverick in an episode from the final season of the Western comedy television series Maverick titled "The Golden Fleecing."

She also appeared in the third episode of the first season, initially broadcast on February 3, 1959, in the science fiction series Alcoa Presents: One Step Beyond titled "Emergency Only," which also memorably featured Jocelyn Brando as a screaming fortune teller at a party.

In 1962, she portrayed the role of Franny Wells in the episode "House of the Hunter" on Rawhide.

Personal life

In 1962, Raymond was a passenger in a car that crashed into a tree on Sunset Boulevard. Her nose was severed by the rear view mirror. After a little more than a year of extensive plastic surgery and recovery she returned to acting. In 1977, while working on the soap opera Days of Our Lives, after only three appearances, she accidentally tripped on a telephone cord and broke her ankle. She was written out of the show. In 1984, she broke both hips, and in 1994, she broke her shoulder.

In 1944, Raymond married Floyd Leroy Patterson. In 1946, they divorced shortly after the birth of their daughter, Raeme Dorene Patterson. In 1993, Raymond's daughter died.

Raymond was Roman Catholic.

Death 
On December 31, 2003, Raymond died at Cedars-Sinai Medical Center in Los Angeles from a series of respiratory ailments. She was 79. She is interred at Holy Cross Cemetery in Culver City, California.

References in literature 
Paula Raymond is referenced in Joan Didion's Play It as It Lays with an unnamed character remarking "'Gee, Paula Raymond was a pretty girl... Funny she never became a star.'" This quote comes after the protagonist, an actress named Maria, has a traumatic abortion, and seems to be drawing a parallel between Maria and Raymond.

Partial filmography

 Keep Smiling (1938) - Bettina Bowman
 Variety Girl (1947) - Variety Girl (uncredited)
 Night Has a Thousand Eyes (1948) - Companion (uncredited)
 Rusty Leads the Way (1948) - Louise Adams
 Sealed Verdict (1948) - WAC guard for Erika
 Racing Luck (1948) - Natalie Gunther
 Blondie's Secret (1948) - Dr. Mason's Nurse (uncredited
 Challenge of the Range (1949) - Judy Barton
 Adam's Rib (1949) - Emerald - Kip's Girlfriend (uncredited)
 Holiday Affair (1949) - Girl at Drinking Fountain (uncredited)
 East Side, West Side (1949) - Joan Peterson - Bourne's Secretary (uncredited)
 Crisis (1950) - Helen Ferguson
 Duchess of Idaho (1950) - Ellen Hallet
 Devil's Doorway (1950) - Orrie Masters
 Grounds for Marriage (1951) - Agnes Oglethorpe Young
 Inside Straight (1951) - Zoe Carnot
 The Tall Target (1951) - Ginny Beaufort
 Texas Carnival (1951) - Marilla Sabinas
 The Sellout (1952) - Peggy Stauton
 The Bandits of Corsica (1953) - Christina
 The Story of Three Loves (1953) - Mrs. Campbell (segment "Mademoiselle") (uncredited)
 City That Never Sleeps (1953) - Kathy Kelly
 The Beast from 20,000 Fathoms (1953) - Lee Hunter
 King Richard and the Crusaders (1954) - Queen Berengaria
 The Human Jungle (1954) - Pat Danforth
 The Gun That Won the West (1955) - Mrs. Maxine Gaines
 The Flight That Disappeared (1961) - Marcia Paxton
 Hand of Death (1962) - Carol Wilson
 Blood of Dracula's Castle (1969) - Countess Townsend
 Five Bloody Graves (1969) - Kansas Kelly
 Mind Twister (1993) - Agnes (final film role)

Bibliography

References

External links

 
 Paula Raymond  interview at  www.westernclippings.com

1924 births
2003 deaths
American film actresses
American television actresses
Deaths from respiratory failure
Actresses from San Francisco
People from Greater Los Angeles
Metro-Goldwyn-Mayer contract players
Burials at Holy Cross Cemetery, Culver City
20th-century American actresses
American Roman Catholics
21st-century American women